Senningerberg is a town in the commune of Niederanven, in central Luxembourg. It is adjacent to the Grunewald forest and is characterised by an abundance of green natural spaces.

, the town has a population of 1,663.

Senningerberg was served by the Luxembourg City-Echternach narrow-gauge railway line from 1904 until its closure in 1954.

References

Niederanven
Towns in Luxembourg